The High Commissioner of the United Kingdom to Australia is an officer of the Foreign and Commonwealth Office and the United Kingdom's foremost diplomatic representative to the Commonwealth of Australia. Despite Britain's close relationship with Australia, the first High Commissioner from London was not appointed until 1936, owing to the clarification of Britain's relations with the Imperial Dominions after the Statute of Westminster 1931.

Office history

From the beginning of the British colonisation in 1788 and after Australia's federation in 1901, the Governor-General of Australia and the various state governors had been the official representatives of the British government, as well as the Crown. Following the 1926 Imperial Conference and the subsequent Balfour Declaration an Australian, Sir Isaac Isaacs, became Governor-General in January 1931. Being an Australian, it was felt in London he couldn't properly represent the British Government. They thus appointed their Representative for Migration in Melbourne Ernest Tristram Crutchley as their first Representative of His Majesty's Government in Australia, pending the nomination of a High Commissioner, on the Canadian model.

That same year, the Statute of Westminster made easier the creation of such High Commissions in the Dominions but as the Australian Government delayed its ratification, the United Kingdom had to wait until 1936 to appoint a High Commissioner to regularise the role of the Governor-General in Australia, six years before Australia's actual ratification of the Statute.

Office-holders

References

External links
British High Commission Canberra - GOV.UK

Australia and the Commonwealth of Nations
Australia–United Kingdom relations
Australia
 
United Kingdom High Commissioner
United Kingdom and the Commonwealth of Nations